(July 11, 1198 – November 26, 1261) was a Japanese samurai of the Kamakura period. He was the third Kitakata Rokuhara tandai, serving from 1230 to 1247. His writings influenced later samurai philosophy.

References
Stenstrup, Carl (1979). Hōjō Shigetoki, 1198-1261, and His Role in the History of Political and Ethical Ideas in Japan. (London: Curzon Press).

Samurai
1198 births
1261 deaths
Shigetoki
People of Kamakura-period Japan